Teejan Bai (born 8 August 1956) is an exponent of Pandavani, a traditional performing art form, from Chhattisgarh, in which she enacts tales from the Mahabharata, with musical accompaniments.

She has been awarded the Padma Shri in 1988, Padma Bhushan in 2003, and Padma Vibhushan in 2019 by Government of India, besides 1995 Sangeet Natak Akademi Award in 1995, given by Sangeet Natak Akademi, India's National Academy of Music, Dance & Drama.

Biography

Early life
She belongs to the Pardhi Scheduled Tribe of Chhattisgarh state.

The eldest among her five siblings, she heard her maternal grandfather, Brijlal Pardhi, recite the Mahabharata written by Chhattisgarhi writer, Sabal Singh Chauhan in Chhattisgarhi Hindi and instantly took a liking to it. She soon memorised much of it, and later trained informally under Umed Singh Deshmukh.

Career
At age 13, she gave her first public performance in a neighbouring village, Chandrakhuri (Durg) for Rs 10., singing in the VEDMATI SHAILI (style) of 'Pandavani', a first time for a woman, as traditionally women used to sing in the Vedamati, the sitting style.  Contrary to the tradition, Teejan Bai performed standing singing out loud in her typical guttural voice and unmistakable verve, entering what was till then, a male bastion.

Within a short time, she became known in neighbouring villages and invitations poured to perform at special occasions and festivals.

Her big-break came, when Habib Tanvir, a theatre personality from Madhya Pradesh, noticed her talent, and she was called to perform for then Prime Minister, Indira Gandhi.  In time she received national and international recognition, a Padma Shri in 1988, Sangeet Natak Akademi Award in 1995, and Padma Bhushan in 2003.

Beginning in the 1980s, she travelled all over the world as a cultural ambassador, to countries as far as England, France, Switzerland, Germany, Turkey, Tunisia, Malta, Cyprus, Romania and Mauritius. She performed sequences from the Mahabharata in Shyam Benegal's acclaimed Doordarshan TV series Bharat Ek Khoj based on Jawaharlal Nehru's book.

Today she continues to enthrall audiences, the world over with her unique folk singing and her powerful voice; and pass on her singing to the younger generation.
She has recently received highest honour of Padma Vibhshan in 2019

Personal life
Though she was married at 12, she was expelled by the community, the 'Pardhi' tribe, for singing Pandavani, being a woman. She built herself a small hut and started living on her own, borrowing utensils and food from neighbours, yet never left her singing, which eventually paid off for her. She never went to her first husband's home and later split (divorce).  In the following years, she was married twice and later became a grandmother.

Performance style
Pandavani, literally means stories of Pandavas, the legendary brothers in Mahabharat, and involves enacting and singing with instrumental accompaniment an ektara or a tambura in one hand and sometimes a kartal in another. As the performance progresses, the tambura becomes her only prop, sometimes to personify a gada, mace of Bhima, or Arjuna's bow or chariot, while at other times it becomes the hair of queen Draupadi, allowing her to play various character with effective ease and candour. Her acclaimed performances are of, Draupadi cheerharan, Dushasana Vadh and Mahabharat Yudh, between Bhishma and Arjun.

Awards

 1988 Padma Shri
 1995 Sangeet Natak Akademi Award
 2003 Hon. D.Litt., Bilaspur University
 2003 Padma Bhushan
 2016 M S Subbalaxmi centenary award
 2018 Fukuoka prize
 2019 Padma Vibhushan

See also
 Music of Chhattisgarh

References

External links
Facebook page
Teejan Bai, a profile on her narration of the Mahabharata

Portrait of Teejan Bai at Kamat.com
Bharat Ek Khoj Episode 5 at YouTube.com
Chhattisgarhi Pandwani

1956 births
Living people
Indian women folk singers
Singers from Chhattisgarh
Indian folk singers
Artists from Chhattisgarh
Recipients of the Padma Bhushan in arts
Recipients of the Padma Shri in arts
Recipients of the Sangeet Natak Akademi Award
Recipients of the Sangeet Natak Akademi Fellowship
Recipients of the Fukuoka Prize
Indian storytellers
People from Durg district
Women artists from Chhattisgarh
20th-century Indian women singers
20th-century Indian singers
21st-century Indian singers
21st-century Indian women singers
Recipients of the Padma Vibhushan in arts